This is a list of earthquakes in 1973. Only magnitude 6.0 or greater earthquakes appear on the list. Lower magnitude events are included if they have caused death, injury or damage. Events which occurred in remote areas will be excluded from the list as they wouldn't have generated significant media interest. All dates are listed according to UTC time. Maximum intensities are indicated on the Mercalli intensity scale and are sourced from United States Geological Survey (USGS) ShakeMap data. Both the number of large events and the death toll were substantially lower in 1973. There was 9 magnitude 7.0+ events. The largest of these was in Japan measuring 7.7. Russia and New Hebrides were active during the year with each country having 2 magnitude 7.0+ events. Nearly 3,000 deaths were reported with China being worst affected. Mexico also had a significant death toll.

Overall

By death toll 

 Note: At least 10 casualties

By magnitude 

 Note: At least 7.0 magnitude

Notable events

January

February

March

April

May

June

July

August

September

October

November

December

References

1973
 
1973